'It's All About Me' is a song by American singer Mýa. It served as her debut single from her self-titled debut studio album and recorded as a duet with R&B singer Sisqó. A psychedelic R&B slow jam, "It's All About Me" was written and composed by Sisqó and Darryl Pearson, while the latter served as producer. It interpolated the composition “Moments in Love” by Art of Noise.

Following its release, "It's All About Me" received generally mixed to positive reviews from contemporary music critics, whom compared Harrison to her contemporary peers Brandy and Monica. A commercial success, "It's All About Me" became a Top Ten hit on the Billboard Hot 100 for the week of May 16, 1998 where it peaked and spent three consecutive weeks at number six. It fared better on the Hot R&B Singles chart, where it reached number two. Internationally, the single was a modest success; it reached the Top 20 in New Zealand and Top 40 in Canada.

The song's accompanying music video was filmed by director G. Thomas Ferguson and University Music CEO Haqq Islam. Given her artistic background, Harrison choreographed the dance routines and designed her own outfit - a red Chinese traditional wedding dress. The music video featured Harrison performing a strip tease and fencing with Sisqó after they meet following a concert from Sisqó's group, Dru Hill (Harrison, Sisqó, and Dru Hill were all label mates at the time on University Music).

Background
In an interview with Rolling Stone magazine, Harrison described the concept behind "It’s All About Me": "It's not a conceited thing. Basically, I'm speaking for people who are in relationships but aren't getting their fifty percent. The song is about taking control. Personally, I'm not trying to get into relationships right now. But when I do, it's fifty-fifty."

Critical reception
Billboards Larry Flick gave "It's All About Me" a favorable review, writing,
"Although It's All About Me can be too repetitive and thus unnecessarily tiring at times, it does have an interesting, catchy rhythm that's hard to miss. Undoubtedly, R&B listeners will find this highly appealing. The vocals have a great range, as well as a smooth, angelic tone. It's worth giving it a try." Writing for Spin magazine, Charles Aaron described "It's All About Me" as a "G-rated version of Lil' Kims pussy-power politics." Music Week called "It's All About Me," a catchy R&B outing."

Accolades

Chart performance
In the United States, It's All About Me debuted at number eighty-two on the Billboard Hot 100 chart for the issue dated week of March 14, 1998. It ascended from 82-62 in its second week for the issue dated week of March 21, 1998. The song reached its peak at number six for issue dated week of May 16, 1998. From the issue dated weeks of May 16–30, 1998; it spent 3 consecutive weeks at number six. It spent a total of 20 consecutive weeks on the chart. The single became Harrison's first consecutive Top Ten hit (solo) on the chart and was certified gold by Recording Industry Association of America on June 4, 1998 selling 800,000 copies.  It became a Top Five hit on Billboards component Hot R&B Singles chart. It debuted at number sixty-one for the issue dated week of March 14, 1998. It rose from 61-31 in its second week for the issue dated week of March 21, 1998. It's All About Me entered the coveted Top Ten at number eight for issue dated week of April 18, 1998. It reached its peak at number two the issue dated week of May 9, 1998. The song spent a total of 27 consecutive weeks on the chart. It's All About Me remains Harrison's biggest and highest charting single to date on the Hot R&B Singles chart.

In Canada, the song reached its peak at number thirty-nine for the issue dated week of April 25, 1998. It spent a total of 6 consecutive weeks on the chart.  It's All About Me debuted at number twenty-seven during the week of June 21, 1998 in New Zealand. It reached its peak at number thirteen during the week of July 19, 1998. It spent a total of 15 consecutive weeks on the chart.

Music video
In an interview with MTV News, Mýa talked about the concept behind the video for "All About Me," on which Sisqó reprises his smooth-talkin', ladies man role. "Sisqó pulls me out of the crowd," Mýa explained, "because I guess I look uninterested, and that's not common, y'know to have people uninterested in such big stars. So, he pulls me out thinking he's gonna make me his lady of the night." "Through the dance and the whole video," she continued, "I tease him and say, 'No, I'm not that kind of girl and if you wanna be with me, you have to make it all about me.'"

Legacy
Rolling Stone editor Rob Sheffield ranked "It's All About Me" number nineteen on their 98 Best Songs of 1998 list.

Formats and track listings

US CD Single & Maxi-Single
 It's All About Me (Radio Version) –  4:24   
 It's All About Me (LP Version) –  4:26

UK 12" Single 
A1 It's All About Me (Album Version)    
A2 It's All About Me (New R&B Remix Clean)     
B1 It's All About Me (Hula's Club Mix)   

European CD Single & Maxi-Single
 It's All About Me (Radio Version) –  4:24   
 It's All About Me (New R&B Remix Clean) –  3:44   
 It's All About Me (Hula Radio Mix)  –  5:59

Credits and personnel

Produced by: Darryl "DAY" Pearson
Vocal Arrangements: Pearson and Sisqo
Recording Studio: Silent Sound Studios
Recording Engineer: Mike Alvord

Asst. Recording Engineer: Kevin Lively
Mix Studio: Studio 56
Mixing Engineer: Tom Kidd

Charts

Weekly charts

Year-end charts

Certifications

Release history

See also
List of Billboard Hot 100 top 10 singles in 1998

References

External links
 MyaMya.com — official site

1998 songs
1998 debut singles
Mýa songs
Interscope Records singles
Songs written by Darryl Pearson (musician)
Songs written by Sisqó